Adewale Mayowa Emmanuel (born 23 March 1994), known professionally as Mayorkun, is a Nigerian singer, songwriter and pianist. He released a cover of Davido's "The Money" single and was discovered by the singer on Twitter. Mayorkun was signed to Davido's record label DMW from 2016 to 2021; his debut single "Eleko" was released under the label. Mayorkun released his debut studio album The Mayor of Lagos in November 2018. After his exit from DMW in 2021; he released "Let Me Know"  and his second studio album Back In Office in October 2021, under  Sony Music West Africa division.

Early life 
Mayorkun was born on 23 March, 1994 in Osun State, Nigeria. He is the first child of three, born into a family of entertainers. His mother is a Nollywood actress and his father, an artist and movie producer. Mayorkun was part of the choir at a very young age where he, according to him "learnt the rudiments of music". He has a degree in accounting from the University of Lagos, and was in a banking job before he was discovered in 2016.

Music career 
Mayorkun decided to leave his bank job to search for another due to bad pay, when his cover video was spotted by Davido in February 2016. Davido followed him on Twitter and Instagram, after which Davido asked him if he can do more than play the keyboard. He got a call from Davido the same day he wrote his resignation letter and sent Davido some of the songs he already recorded. Davido decided to sign him to Davido Music Worldwide. Mayorkun released his first single under the label called "Eleko" in 2016. The song debuted on number 9 on the Nigeria Playdata charts, on 1 May 2016, and reached number 5, on 28 May 2016. The video of the song gathered a million views in the first 10 days. To his name, Mayorkun has several singles including Yawa, Sade, Che Che, and Mama. In October 2018, he released singles "Posh" and "Fantasy" featuring Olu Maintain in anticipation of his first studio album titled "The Mayor of Lagos". The Mayor of Lagos was released on the 16th of November, 2018. On December 1, 2018, it appeared on the Billboard World Albums chart, peaking at number 15.

In 2020, he was among the artistes scheduled for performance at the Convention center of the Eko Hotel and suites, Victoria Island, Lagos for the 2020 vanguard personality awards. Other scheduled artistes included Tekno, Timaya and many more.

The Mayor of Lagos concert 
Mayorkun embarked on a nationwide tour in 2017 that saw him perform in over 35 schools. He ended the year 2017 with his first headline concert in Lagos called "The Mayor of Lagos". The Mayor of Lagos concert continued in 2018 with a show in the city of Ibadan and the federal capital territory, Abuja. Also, a date for a Lagos edition was announced. In 2018, Mayorkun did a tour of the  UK alongside label mate Dremo, where he performed in about six cities. He also performed alongside label boss Davido at the wireless festival.

Exit from DMW, and Back In Office
In 2021, he announce his exit from DMW at the release party of his second album "Back In Office", in an interview with Ebuka Obi-Uchendu, they both (Davido, and Mayorkun) shared the news with fans at his album lunch party. The studio album "Back In Office", was released through Sony Music, West Africa division in Nigeria on 29 October, 2021.

Discography

Studio albums and EPs
The Mayor of Lagos (2018)
Geng (EP) (2020)
Back In Office (Album) (2021)

Selected singles

Awards and nominations

References

External links 

Nigerian singer-songwriters
1994 births
Living people
Yoruba musicians
Yoruba-language singers
English-language singers from Nigeria
Musicians from Osun State
University of Lagos alumni